The 2017 China Open was a professional ranking snooker tournament, that took place between 27 March and 2 April 2017 at the Beijing University Students' Gymnasium in Beijing, China. It was the 18th and penultimate ranking event of the 2016–17 season. The tournament was broadcast in Europe on Eurosport and Eurosport Player.

Judd Trump was the defending champion, but he lost in the quarter-finals to Hossein Vafaei.

Mark Selby defeated Mark Williams 10–8 in the final to win his second China Open title and 11th career ranking title overall.

Trump made the 130th official maximum break and the third of his career in the fifth frame of his 5–3 win over Tian Pengfei in the third round.

Prize fund
The breakdown of prize money for this year is shown below:

Winner: £85,000
Runner-up: £35,000
Semi-final: £21,000
Quarter-final: £12,500
Last 16: £8,000
Last 32: £6,500
Last 64: £4,000

Televised highest break: £2,000
Total: £510,000

The "rolling 147 prize" for a maximum break: £30,000.

Wildcard round
These matches were played in Beijing on 27 March 2017.

Main draw

Final

Qualifying
These matches were played from 24 to 27 January 2017 at the Guild Hall in Preston, England, except for 4 matches which were held over and played in Beijing on 27 March 2017. All matches were best of 9 frames.

Century breaks

Televised stage centuries
Total: 54

 147, 135, 122, 108, 105, 102  Judd Trump
 140  Zhang Anda
 138, 127, 123, 109  Ding Junhui
 137, 108  Mark Joyce
 136, 126, 124, 113, 109, 104, 101, 100  Mark Selby
 135, 118, 101  Michael White
 133, 124  Martin O'Donnell
 132, 106  Ronnie O'Sullivan
 131  David Gilbert
 130, 101  Kyren Wilson
 129, 114, 100  Stephen Maguire
 125  Ricky Walden

 124, 106, 103  Mark Williams
 123  Gary Wilson
 120  Xiao Guodong
 114  Martin Gould
 113, 104, 101, 101  Shaun Murphy
 109  Aditya Mehta
 108  Rory McLeod
 106, 100  Hossein Vafaei
 106  Rhys Clark
 105  Andrew Higginson
 103, 100  Ben Woollaston
 103  Daniel Wells

Qualifying stage centuries

Total: 22

 137  Marco Fu
 136  Joe Perry
 134  Liam Highfield
 130  Stuart Carrington
 126  Luca Brecel
 125  Stephen Maguire
 125  Stuart Bingham
 119  Lee Walker
 116  Fraser Patrick
 115  Tian Pengfei
 113  Mitchell Mann

 111  Mark King
 108  Rhys Clark
 107  Ronnie O'Sullivan
 107  Michael Holt
 104  John Astley
 102  Jamie Jones
 102  Martin Gould
 102  Zhou Yuelong
 101  Fergal O'Brien
 100  Gary Wilson
 100  Xiao Guodong

Notes

References

China Open (snooker)
China Open
Open (snooker)
China Open
China Open
2010s in Beijing
Sports competitions in Beijing